The Southwest Asia Service Medal (SASM or SWASM) is a military award of the United States Armed Forces which was created by order of President George H.W. Bush on March 12, 1991. The award is intended to recognize those military service members who performed duty as part of the Persian Gulf War and for a time thereafter. The medal was designed by Nadine Russell of the Army's Institute of Heraldry. The colors of the ribbon are tan, representing sand, with the black, white, red, blue, and green colors symbolizing the colors of coalition countries' national flags.

History

Individuals awarded the Southwest Asia Service Medal must have participated in or supported military operations in Southwest Asia between August 2, 1990, and November 30, 1995. That period of inclusion includes participation in Operations Desert Shield or Desert Storm:

 Iraq
 Kuwait
 Saudi Arabia
 Oman
 Bahrain
 Qatar
 United Arab Emirates
 Persian Gulf
 Red Sea
 Gulf of Oman
 Gulf of Aden
 that portion of the Arabian Sea that lies north of 10 degrees North latitude and west of 68 degrees East longitude

Individuals serving in Israel, Egypt, Turkey, Syria and Jordan (including the airspace and territorial waters) directly supporting combat operations between January 17, 1991, and April 11, 1991, are also eligible for this award.

To receive the award, a service member must be: attached to or regularly serving for one or more days with an organization participating in ground/shore military operations; attached to or regularly serving for one or more days aboard a naval vessel directly supporting military operations; actually participating as a crew member in one or more aerial flights directly supporting military operations in the areas designated; or serving on temporary duty for 30 consecutive days or 60 nonconsecutive days, except, if a waiver is authorized for personnel participating in actual combat.

For those service members who performed "home service" during the Persian Gulf War, such as support personnel in the United States, the Southwest Asia Service Medal is not authorized.  The award is also not authorized for those who performed support of the Persian Gulf War from European or Pacific bases.

2016 redesign
In April 2016, the appearance of the suspension and service ribbon of the SWASM was slightly modified by the United States Department of Defense through the Defense Logistics Agency (DLA). The DLA made the two vertical green bars and one vertical black bar in the middle wider than in the original 1991 version.

Campaign phases and devices
The following are the approved campaign phases and respective inclusive dates for the Southwest Asia Service Medal (SWASM):

The following ribbon devices are authorized for wear on the Southwest Asia Service Medal:
  Campaign stars (all branches)
  Fleet Marine Force Combat Operation Insignia (Navy personnel assigned to a Marine Corps unit in combat)

Examples of campaign stars worn on the Southwest Asia Campaign service ribbon:

While several operations occurred in the geographical areas described above between April 12, 1991, and November 30, 1995, including Operation Provide Comfort (June 1, 1992 – November 30, 1995), Operation Southern Watch (August 27, 1992 – April 29, 2003) and Operation Vigilant Warrior (October 14, 1994 – December 21, 1994), these operations were covered under the third campaign, Southwest Asia Cease-Fire. Service in Operations that extended beyond the final campaign date of November 30, 1995, were recognized by awards of either the Armed Forces Expeditionary Medal or the Armed Forces Service Medal.):

See also
 Gulf War military awards

References

1991 establishments in the United States
Awards established in 1991
Military awards and decorations of the Gulf War
United States service medals